Georg Franz Knoop (20 September 1875, Shanghai – 2 August 1946, Tübingen) was a German biochemist, most well known for his discovery of the β-oxidation of the fatty acids in 1905.

Alongside Hans Adolf Krebs and Carl Martius, he clarified the reaction sequence of the citric acid cycle in 1937. He determined the structure of histidine and demonstrated that amino acids can be synthesized not only in plants, but also in animals.

References

1875 births
1946 deaths
German biochemists
Citric acid cycle